Craig Dillingham (born 1958 in Brownwood, Texas) is an American country music artist. Before signing to Curb Records in 1983, Dillingham performed with his family musical group and later served as an opening act for Ray Price, in addition to performing on the Louisiana Hayride. He charted five singles for the label between 1983 and 1986, including "Have You Loved Your Woman Today", his only Top 40 hit on the Billboard country charts.

Singles

References

American country singer-songwriters
American male singer-songwriters
Living people
Singer-songwriters from Texas
Curb Records artists
1958 births
Country musicians from Texas